The 2015 Carlisle City Council election took place on 7 May 2015 to elect members of Carlisle City Council in England. They occurred on the same day as other local elections.

By-elections between 2015 and 2016

References

2015 English local elections
May 2015 events in the United Kingdom
2015
2010s in Cumbria